Nathaniel James Loughran is an American mixed martial artist. Loughran was formerly signed to the Ultimate Fighting Championship, and currently competes for Tachi Palace Fights.

Mixed martial arts career

Amateur mixed martial arts career
Loughran is 2-0 in his amateur MMA career, with his first fight taking place on October 27, 2007, as he defeated Shawn Ady via arm-triangle at Hard Knocks Cage Fights 1. Then on May 17, 2008, Loughran defeated Ed Mouse via TKO at COC 2: Overthrow.

Ultimate Fighting Championship
Loughran's first UFC fight was against Johnny Rees at UFC Fight Night: Silva vs. Irvin, where he won by submission in the first round.

Loughran lost his second UFC fight against Tim Credeur at UFC: Fight for the Troops via TKO (injury) in the third round. After his loss to Credeur he asked to be released from the UFC.

In late 2013, Loughran was re-signed by the promotion and was expected to face Erick Silva on February 15, 2014 at UFC Fight Night 36. However, Loughran was forced out of the bout due to injury. Due to more training injuries, Loughran was once again released from the promotion and re-signed with Tachi Palace Fights.

Championships and accomplishments
Tachi Palace Fights
TPF Welterweight Championship (One time)

Mixed martial arts record

|-
| Loss
| align=center| 11–2
| Ricky Legere
| Submission (rear-naked choke)
| TPF 20: Night of Champions
| 
| align=center| 3
| align=center| 2:51
| Lemoore, California, United States
| 
|-
| Win
| align=center| 11–1
| Kito Andrews
| Decision (unanimous)
| TPF 17: Fall Brawl
| 
| align=center| 5
| align=center| 5:00
| Lemoore, California, United States
| 
|-
| Win
| align=center| 10–1
| Jaime Jara
| Decision (split)
| CCFC: The Return
| 
| align=center| 3
| align=center| 5:00
| Santa Rosa, California, United States
| 
|-
| Loss
| align=center| 9–1
| Tim Credeur
| TKO (injury)
| UFC: Fight for the Troops
| 
| align=center| 2
| align=center| 5:00
| Fayetteville, North Carolina, United States
| 
|-
| Win
| align=center| 9–0
| Johnny Rees
| Submission (triangle choke)
| UFC Fight Night: Silva vs. Irvin
| 
| align=center| 1
| align=center| 4:21
| Las Vegas, Nevada, United States
| 
|-
| Win
| align=center| 8–0
| Kenny Ento
| Submission (rear-naked choke)
| PFC 8: A Night of Champions
| 
| align=center| 2
| align=center| 2:30
| Lemoore, California, United States
| 
|-
| Win
| align=center| 7–0
| Richard Montoya
| Submission (armbar)
| PFC 6: No Retreat, No Surrender
| 
| align=center| 2
| align=center| 0:38
| Lemoore, California, United States
| 
|-
| Win
| align=center| 6–0
| Brian Warren
| Submission (rear-naked choke)
| PFC 4: Project Complete
| 
| align=center| 1
| align=center| 2:39
| Lemoore, California, United States
| 
|-
| Win
| align=center| 5–0
| Phil Collins
| Submission (triangle choke)
| CCFC: Judgment Day
| 
| align=center| 1
| align=center| 0:41
| Santa Rosa, California, United States
| 
|-
| Win
| align=center| 4–0
| Robert Sarkozi
| Submission (triangle choke)
| GC 57: Holiday Beatings
| 
| align=center| 1
| align=center| 3:28
| Sacramento, California, United States
| 
|-
| Win
| align=center| 3–0
| Bryan Travers
| Submission (triangle choke)
| GC 55: Beatdown
| 
| align=center| 1
| align=center| 1:42
| Lakeport, California, United States
| 
|-
| Win
| align=center| 2–0
| Brandon Colvin
| TKO (strikes)
| GC 52: Deep Impact
| 
| align=center| 1
| align=center| 1:12
| Lakeport, California, United States
| 
|-
| Win
| align=center| 1–0
| Erik Hayes
| Submission (armbar)
| GC 49: Face Off
| 
| align=center| 1
| align=center| 0:20
| Lakeport, California, United States
|

Amateur mixed martial arts record

|-
|Win
|align=center|2–0
|Ed Mouse
|TKO (punches)
|COC 2: Overthrow
|
|align=center|2
|align=center|1:51
|St. Clairsville, Ohio, United States
|
|-
|Win
|align=center|1–0
|Shawn Ady
|Submission (arm-triangle choke)
|HKCF: Hard Knocks Cage Fights 1
|
|align=center|1
|align=center|2:41
|St. Clairsville, Ohio, United States
|

References

External links
 
 Archived UFC Profile

Year of birth missing (living people)
Living people
People from Rohnert Park, California
American male mixed martial artists
Mixed martial artists from California
Middleweight mixed martial artists
Ultimate Fighting Championship male fighters